Sweet Revenge 2 is a South Korean television series starring Ahn Seo-hyun, Samuel and Ji Min-hyuk. It is the sequel to the 2017 streaming television series Sweet Revenge which drew 11 million combined views. It aired on xtvN's Mondays and Tuesdays at 20:00 (KST) time slot from August 13 to October 9, 2018.

Synopsis
Oh Ji-na discovers an application on her phone which takes revenge on anyone whose name is written in it.

Cast

Main
 Ahn Seo-hyun as Oh Ji-na (17 years old)
 Samuel Kim as Seo Robin (17 years old)
 Ji Min-hyuk as Seo Jaeyi (17 years old)

Supporting

Oh Ji-na's family
 Kim Ji-young as Oh Sa-na (14 years old)
 Ji-na's little sister.
 Park Hee-jin as Kim Eun-hee (45 years old)
 Ji-na and Sa-na's mother
 Seo Yu-ri as Kim Seon-hee (40 years old)
 Eun-hee's sister. Ji-na and Sa-na's aunt.
 Sung Ji-ru as Oh Kang-dong (47 years old)
 The convenience store manager and Ji-na and Sa-na's father, as well as Eun-hee's ex-husband.

Robin and Jaeyi's family
 ??? as Robin & Jaeyi's mother (40 years old)
 Hwang Tae-kwang as Robin & Jaeyi's dad (40 years old)

Teachers at Han Jong High School
 Kim Ye-eun as Maeng Sa-rang (22 years old)
 ??? as Go Jin-sang (50 years old)
 Park Dong-bin as Lee Dae-ro (40 years old)
 Jeong Jeong-ah as Jeong Jeong-ah (30 years old)
 Hwang Tae-gwang as Choi Kang (30 years old)

Students
 Kim So-hee as Geum Soo-ji 
 Song Soo-hyun as Bae Shin-ae
 Shin Ji-hoon as Cho Eun-yeon
 Park Ji-hu as Lee Ha-yan
 Park Seo-yeon as Jeong Bo-ra
 Lee Ji-hyun as Ha Rok-hee
 Shin Jun-hang as Ahn Mi-nam
 Cho Young-sun as Na Na-ri
 Gu Ji-hye as Bo Ra-hae
 Park Si-an as Baek Joo-ri
 ?? as Jo A-ra
 Jo Jeong-eun as Park Saem-na
 Lee Ho-jin as Kim Soo-geun
 Hong Dae-wi as Park Su-ro
 Lee Jun-young as Kang Ha-jun
 Song Tae-min as Han Seon-su
 Lee Jae-baek as Ha Ji-man
 Chung Young-hyun as Ban Lee-deun
 Jeong Da-eun as Seung Hee
 ??? as Lim Ba-leun
 ??? as Lee Myung-tae
 ??? as Heo Gi-chan
 ??? as Song

Special appearances
 Ji Gun-woo as Ho Go-joon
 Shin Bong-sun
 Kwon Mina as herself
 Jo Jae-yoon as Ha Rok-hee's father

Original soundtrack

Part 1

Part 2

Part 3

Episodes

Episodes 13 and 14 did not air on September 24 and 25 respectively due to Chuseok.

References

External links
  

 

Korean-language television shows
XtvN original programming
2018 South Korean television series debuts
2018 South Korean television series endings
South Korean teen dramas
South Korean high school television series
Sequel television series
Television series about teenagers
Television series about revenge
Television series by Hidden Sequence